A large number of higher education options are available in the State of New Jersey.  Currently, 31 four-year colleges and universities are located in New Jersey. In addition, there are nineteen county colleges offering two-year programs, serving the 21 counties in the state.

History

Colonial colleges

Among the original thirteen American colonies, New Jersey is unique in that it was the only colony in which two colleges were established before the Declaration of Independence was promulgated in 1776.  Of the nine colonial colleges, New Jersey possessed College of New Jersey, now called Princeton University, founded in 1746 and Queen's College, now known as Rutgers University (or officially as Rutgers, The State University of New Jersey), founded in 1766.

Princeton was established by the New Light Presbyterians.

Rutgers was established by clergy affiliated with the Dutch Reformed Church.

State scholarship programs
To provide post-secondary education to a greater number of New Jersey students and keep high achieving high school students in the Garden State for college, New Jersey established several scholarships. The New Jersey Higher Education Student Assistance Authority (NJHESAA) manages these programs.  They include memorial scholarships, such as the Law Enforcement Officer Memorial Scholarship (for children of New Jersey law enforcement officers killed in the line of duty), and World Trade Center Scholarship Fund (for children of September 11th attack victims).  The NJHESAA also coordinates the Edward J. Bloustein Distinguished Scholar program, the NJ STARS award program, and the NJCLASS student loan program.

Edward J. Bloustein Distinguished Scholar

Every year NJHESAA coordinates the Edward J. Bloustein Distinguished Scholar program.  This award is granted to any New Jersey high school student who ranks in the top 10% of their graduating class at the end of their junior year.  This top 10% must also graduate as the first, second, or third ranking student in the class or achieve at least a 1260 combined critical reading and math score on the Scholastic Aptitude Test. Each student receives $1,000 a year for the duration of their college career so long as they attend a college in New Jersey.  Students can receive the scholarship for no more than five semesters at a two-year institution and no more than eight semesters at a four-year institution.  The award is paid by NJHESAA directly to the institution in which the student is enrolled.

The award was established in the 1989–1990 academic year and posthumously honors Edward J. Bloustein, the seventeenth President of Rutgers University.  The award was granted to more than 5,000 students in the 2006-2007 collegiate academic year.

NJ STARS
In 2004, then Governor Jim McGreevey created the New Jersey Student Tuition Assistance Reward Scholarship program (NJ STARS) to assist New Jersey high school students who go on to one of New Jersey's county colleges after graduation.  Under this program, students who graduated in the top twenty percent of their high school class are provided with free tuition and fees at any New Jersey community college.  The program covers up to five semesters of tuition as long as the student takes at least 12 credits each semester.  Recipients must maintain a 3.0 grade point average through the first year to get the scholarship renewed for the second year.

The program was later expanded to include the NJ STARS II program.  Any student who receives scholarship aid in the NJ STARS program at a county college can receive aid at a New Jersey 4-year college after graduation from the county college.  The NJ STARS II program provides full tuition for the student at participating New Jersey colleges.  The state provides $4,000 for tuition for the student and the college covers the rest of the balance.  A student must also apply for federal aid to reduce what the colleges must provide.

Colleges and universities

Public research universities

State colleges and universities

Independent colleges and universities

Community colleges

Talmudic schools and theological seminaries

Independent religious colleges

Proprietary institutions with degree-granting authority

See also
New Jersey#Education
List of colleges and universities in New Jersey
Lists of colleges and universities
List of universities named after people
Lists of business schools
Lists of law schools
List of medical schools
List of pharmacy schools
List of university and college schools of music
Higher education in the United States
Secondary education in the United States
Primary education in the United States
Education in the United States
New Jersey student loan program

Notes and references

External links
 State of New Jersey
 New Jersey Office of the Secretary of Higher Education

Education in New Jersey